Johanna Welin (born 24  June 1984) is a Swedish-born German 2.0 point wheelchair basketball player.  She played for USC Munich in the German wheelchair basketball league, and for the national team that won the gold medal at the 2012 Summer Paralympics in London, after which President Joachim Gauck awarded the team with the Silbernes Lorbeerblatt (Silver Laurel Leaf).

Biography
She has played football for  Töreboda IK in the Swedish league. In the winter, her passion was snowboarding, until a bad fall in a snowboarding competition at Gothenburg in January 2004 left her paralysed from the waist down.
She then took up wheelchair basketball, playing for GRBK Gothenburg in the Swedish league, but Sweden had no national women's team. She spent two semesters studying German in Insbruck, but there was no wheelchair basketball team there, and she began playing for USC Munich, initially for their second team. There, she caught the attention of Holger Glinicki, the coach of the German national team, who asked her if she would like to play for the German national team. She took German citizenship, a relatively painless procedure for an athlete, and made the German national team, which went on to win gold at the 2011 European Championships in Nazareth, Israel, defeating the Netherlands in the final, 48–42.

In June 2012 she was named as part of the team that competed at the 2012 Summer Paralympic Games in London, where they faced the Australia women's national wheelchair basketball team, a team that had defeated them 48–46 in Sydney just a few months before. They defeated the Australians 44–58 in front of a capacity crowd of over 12,000 at the North Greenwich Arena to win the gold medal, the first that Germany had won in women's wheelchair basketball at the Paralympics since 1984. They were awarded another Silver Laurel Leaf by President Joachim Gauck in November 2012 and were again named Team of the Year for 2012. In February 2013, Welin's name was entered in the Golden Book of Munich. The German team claimed silver at the 2014 Women's World Wheelchair Basketball Championship in Toronto, Ontario, Canada, and beat the Netherlands in the 2015 European Championships, to claim its tenth European title. At the 2016 Paralympic Games, it won silver after losing the final to the United States.

She has modelled for the advertising campaigns of team sponsors ING DiBa and LoFric, and is currently studying medicine in Munich.

Achievements
2011: Gold European Championships (Nazareth, Israel) 
2012: Gold Paralympic Games (London, England) 
2013: Silver European Championships (Frankfurt, Germany) 
2014: Silver at the World Championships (Toronto, Canada) 
 2015: Gold at the European Championships (Worcester, England) 
 2016: Silver at the Paralympic Games (Rio de Janeiro, Brazil)

Awards
2012: Team of the Year 
2012: Silver Laurel Leaf 
2013: Entry in the Golden Book of Munich

References

  Interview with Johanna Welin.

External links
 
 

1984 births
German women's wheelchair basketball players
Living people
Naturalized citizens of Germany
Paralympic gold medalists for Germany
Paralympic wheelchair basketball players of Germany
People from Pajala Municipality
Recipients of the Silver Laurel Leaf
Swedish emigrants to Germany
Wheelchair basketball players at the 2012 Summer Paralympics
Medalists at the 2012 Summer Paralympics
Wheelchair basketball players at the 2016 Summer Paralympics
Medalists at the 2016 Summer Paralympics
Paralympic silver medalists for Germany
Paralympic medalists in wheelchair basketball